The Plott Thickens is the only studio album by Grave Plott, released on May 20, 2008 under Strange Music. It debuted at number 95 on the Top R&B/Hip-Hop Albums chart. The album sold 1,189 units in its first week of release.

Track listing

References

2008 albums
Albums produced by Seven (record producer)
Horrorcore albums
Strange Music albums